Belaya is a rural locality (a sloboda) and the administrative center of Belovsky District of Kursk Oblast, Russia. Population:

References

Notes

Sources

Rural localities in Kursk Oblast